Don Leopoldo Augusto de Cueto y López de Ortega, 1st Marquis of Valmar (16 July 1815 – 12 January 1901) was a Spanish noble, writer, diplomat and politician.

He was born in Cartagena, Spain.  He served as Minister of State in 1857.  He died in Madrid, aged 85.

References
 Personal dossier of the Marquis of Valmar. Spanish Senate

|-

Marquesses of Spain
Foreign ministers of Spain
Ambassadors of Spain to Austria
Ambassadors of Spain to the United States
Commandeurs of the Légion d'honneur
Members of the Royal Spanish Academy
1815 births
1901 deaths
Moderate Party (Spain) politicians
19th-century Spanish politicians
Writers from Cartagena, Spain